Hirtenkäse, or "herder's cheese", is a distinctive cow's milk cheese made in the Allgäu area of Southern Germany.

Traditionally, cow herders bring their cows from the Alps into Allgäu each fall in mid-September.  September 18 typically "marks the official start of the Almabtrieb, or descent, a day celebrated with a festival ...."  Hirtenkäse is made from the milk from these cows.  It is usually aged eight months.

Color, texture and taste

This cheese is "golden" and "Buttery yellow in color...."

Its texture and taste are "rustic, savory and firm textured... with a rugged, earthy aroma."

It has been compared to other hard cheeses of Europe:

Wine and fruit pairings

Hirtenkäse's nutty, earthy flavors can be complemented or contrasted.

A reviewer at the San Francisco Chronicle prefers complementing the cheese, writing, "I want a nutty, slightly sweet wine with it, such as an oloroso sherry or a Madeira."  

iGourmet suggests contrasting the cheese:

Like the bacon-and-chicken liver rumaki, this cheese can be combined with other foods in interesting ways to mix salty and savory flavors.

See also

 German cuisine
 List of German cheeses
 List of cheeses

References

Cow's-milk cheeses
German cheeses
Swabian cuisine